Northland, New Zealand may refer to:

 Northland Peninsula
 Northland Region
 Northland (New Zealand electorate)
 Northland, Wellington